Earl Cureton (born September 3, 1957) is an American retired professional basketball player. His nickname was "The Twirl".

Amateur career
Cureton played high school basketball at Finney High School in Detroit, and signed to play college basketball with Robert Morris, playing there for one season (1976–77), averaging a double-double of 17.2 ppg and 10.5 rpg, before electing to return home to play for the University of Detroit.  Cureton sat out a year with the transfer but paired with future NBA player Terry Duerod to lead the Titans to the 1979 NCAA Division I Basketball Tournament, losing to Lamar 95-87 in the first round.  Detroit finished ranked #20 on the season.  Cureton had a stellar senior season in 1979-80, averaging 19.9 ppg and 9.1 rpg, and was inducted into the Detroit Mercy Titans Hall of Fame in 2007.

Professional career
He was drafted by the Philadelphia 76ers in the 3rd round of the 1979 NBA draft (58th overall pick).   Cureton would spend three seasons in Philadelphia before returning home, signing with the Detroit Pistons for the 1983-84 Detroit Pistons season, spending the next three seasons with Detroit.  He would become a journeyman for the rest of his career, traded to the Chicago Bulls in 1987, and then playing for Los Angeles Clippers (1987–88), Charlotte Hornets (1988–89, 1990–91), Houston Rockets (1993–94) and finally the Toronto Raptors (1996–97). He played 674 NBA regular games and 54 playoff games, averaging 5.4 PPG and 4.7 RPG in 18.4 minutes per game. He won two NBA Championships: with Philadelphia 76ers in the 1982-83 NBA season and with Houston Rockets in the 1993-94 NBA season

Cureton also spent time in the Lega Basket in Italy, the LNB Pro A in France, the Venezuelan SuperLiga, the Liga Nacional de Baloncesto Profesional in Mexico, and the Liga Nacional de Básquet in Argentina, retiring at 39 years old from the Toronto Raptors in February 1997.

Post-playing career 
Cureton serves as a Community Ambassador for the Detroit Pistons, a position he has held since 2013. This role includes leading Pistons organizational outreach and community partnerships.

Before assuming his role with the Pistons, Cureton spent several years coaching in the WNBA, the United States Basketball League and the Continental Basketball Association.  Cureton fulfilled a promise to his mother, returning to finish his degree at UD in 2011 and serves as a color analyst for Detroit Mercy Titans ESPN+ and radio broadcasts.

References

External links
 Earl Cureton career statistics

1957 births
Living people
African-American basketball players
American expatriate basketball people in Canada
American expatriate basketball people in France
American expatriate basketball people in Italy
American men's basketball players
Basketball coaches from Michigan
Basketball players from Detroit
Centers (basketball)
Charlotte Hornets players
Chicago Bulls players
Continental Basketball Association coaches
Detroit Pistons players
Detroit Mercy Titans men's basketball players
Houston Rockets players
Junior college men's basketball players in the United States
Los Angeles Clippers players
Olimpia Milano players
Philadelphia 76ers draft picks
Philadelphia 76ers players
Power forwards (basketball)
Robert Morris Colonials men's basketball players
Toronto Raptors players
21st-century African-American people
20th-century African-American sportspeople